Disgorgement is defined by Black's Law Dictionary as "the act of giving up something (such as profits illegally obtained) on demand or by legal compulsion."

Overview
Disgorgement is a remedy or penalty used in US securities law. For example, disgorgement of short-swing profits is the remedy prescribed by § 16(b) of the Securities Exchange Act of 1934. 

The second edition of American Jurisprudence states that:

Although not labelled "disgorgement," recovery of profits from the wrongful use of a patent or copyright belonging to another person or entity has a long history in US law. The US Supreme Court, in Sheldon v. Metro-Goldwyn Pictures Corp., 309 U.S. 390, 399-400 (1940), stated:

In Kokesh v. SEC, 137 S. Ct. 1635 (2017), the US Supreme Court unanimously disagreed with the view of the Security and Exchange Commission (SEC) that disgorgement in the case was remedial but held that disgorgement payments to the SEC in the case were penalties. The decision raised the questions of whether the SEC's power to order disgorgement derives only from statute, which would make congressional action necessary for the SEC to pursue disgorgement orders in federal court, and of whether the amounts awarded should be limited to actual profits gained. After Kokesh, the SEC has argued in district courts throughout the US that outside Kokesh in the statute of limitations context, disgorgement is not a penalty but an equitable remedy. 

Subsequently, in Liu v. SEC (591 U.S. ___ (2020)), the US Supreme Court affirmed that disgorgement awards could be issued as equitable remedies by the SEC but could not exceed the wrongdoer's net profits, as under , and that they should be funds returned to the defrauded investors.

Disgorgement is a remedy for violations of the UA Commodity Exchange Act. The purpose of such a remedy, as in securities cases, is "to deprive the wrongdoer of his or her ill-gotten gains and to deter violations of the law." However, in such cases, the court may order disgorgement only up to "the amount with interest by which a defendant profited from his or her wrongdoing."

Disgorgement payments to the SEC have for decades been considered completely equitable and compensatory and thus deductible under the Internal Revenue Code. The December 2017 tax reform law provided that to be deductible, such payments must now be identified in the relevant court order or settlement agreement as serving one of a number of specific purposes, and the appropriate government official must report to the IRS the total amount of the payment and the amount of the payment that constitutes restitution or the amount paid to come into compliance with law. The new law adds Section 6050X, which requires the government to file an IRS information return setting out any amount paid (over $600) in a suit or agreement to or at the direction of the government in relation to the violation of any law, and it must set forth any amount that is restitution or remediation.

See also
 Bonus–malus
 Clawback
 Fair Fund
 Surcharge (sanction)

References
  

Judicial remedies
Asset forfeiture
sv:Förverkande